The Mayoral election of 1961 in Pittsburgh, Pennsylvania was held on Tuesday, November 7, 1961. The incumbent mayor, Joe Barr of the Democratic Party won his first full term as mayor, after achieving the position in a 1959 special election. Barr received more than twice as many votes as his Republican opponent, insurance agent William Crehan.

Results

References

1961 Pennsylvania elections
1961 United States mayoral elections
1961
1960s in Pittsburgh
November 1961 events in the United States